Togo Anthony Palazzi (August 8, 1932 – August 12, 2022) was an American basketball player who played in the National Basketball Association (NBA) for the Boston Celtics and Syracuse Nationals.

Playing and coaching career
A 6'4" forward/guard born and raised in Union City, New Jersey, Palazzi played at Union Hill High School, where he was recognized as one of the top prep basketball players nationwide. He played at the College of the Holy Cross in the 1950s and was captain of the Crusaders team that won the 1954 NIT Championship and was named MVP of the tournament.

Palazzi was selected by the Boston Celtics with the fifth pick of the 1954 NBA Draft. He played six seasons in the NBA as a member of the Celtics and Syracuse Nationals and averaged 7.4 points per game in his career.

Palazzi coached the Holy Cross women's team from 1980 to 1985, going 103–28 as coach; he coached them to an NCAA Women's Division I Basketball Tournament appearance in his final year, the first ever appearance by the women's team.

Later life and death

Palazzi later gave speeches at basketball camps for young adults interested in the sport. He was a prominent fixture at camps such as the Scatlet Hawks Basketball Camp run by Steve Manguso in Milford, MA.  Along with conducting area speeches he was the camp director of the Togo Palazzi/Sterling Recreation Basketball Camp in Sterling, Massachusetts.

Palazzi died on August 12, 2022, at the age of 90.

References

External links
 

1932 births
2022 deaths
All-American college men's basketball players
American men's basketball players
Basketball players from New Jersey
Boston Celtics draft picks
Boston Celtics players
Holy Cross Crusaders men's basketball players
Shooting guards
Small forwards
Sportspeople from Union City, New Jersey
Syracuse Nationals players
Union Hill High School alumni